Malandighi (also spelled Molandighi) is a village and a gram panchayat in Kanksa CD block  in the Durgapur subdivision of the Paschim Bardhaman district in the Indian state of West Bengal.

Geography

Urbanisation
According to the 2011 census, 79.22% of the population of Durgapur subdivision was urban and 20.78% was rural. Durgapur subdivision has 1 municipal corporation at Durgapur and 38 (+1 partly) census towns  (partly presented in the map alongside; all places marked on the map are linked in the full-screen map).

Location

Demographics
According to the 2011 Census of India, Malandighi had a toal population of 2,590 of which 1,289 (50%) were males and 1,301 (50%) were females. Population in the age range 0–6 years was 287. The total number of literate persons in Malandighi was 1,537 (66.74% of the population over 6 years).

*For language details see Kanksa (community development block)#Language and religion

Education
Sanaka Education Trusts Group of Institutions, established in 2006, has set up a private engineering college at Malandighi.

Malandighi Durgadas Vidyamandir is a Bengali-medium coeducational institution established in 1953. It has facilities for teaching from class V to class XII. The school has 11 computers, a library with 25 books and a playground.

Malandighi Junior Girls’ High School is a Bengali-medium girls only institution established in 2014. It has facilities for teaching from class V to class VIII.

Kuldiha Junior High School is a Bengali-medium coeducational institution established in 2010. It has facilities for teaching  from class V to class VIII.

Rakshitpur High School is a Bengali-medium coeducational institution established in 1954. It has facilities for teaching from class V to class X.

Healthcare
There is a primary health centre with 6 beds, at Malandighi.

References

Villages in Paschim Bardhaman district